Jhon Fredy Pajoy Ortiz (born November 10, 1988) is a Colombian professional footballer who plays as a winger for Atlético Junior.

Honours

References

1988 births
Living people
Colombian footballers
Colombian expatriate footballers
Boyacá Chicó F.C. footballers
Patriotas Boyacá footballers
Once Caldas footballers
Atlético Nacional footballers
C.F. Pachuca players
Club Puebla players
Independiente Medellín footballers
Talleres de Córdoba footballers
Deportivo Cali footballers
Atlético Bucaramanga footballers
Al-Hazem F.C. players
San Martín de San Juan footballers
Deportivo Pasto footballers
Atlético Junior footballers
Categoría Primera A players
Liga MX players
Saudi Professional League players
Primera Nacional players
Colombian expatriate sportspeople in Argentina
Colombian expatriate sportspeople in Mexico
Colombian expatriate sportspeople in Saudi Arabia
Expatriate footballers in Argentina
Expatriate footballers in Mexico
Expatriate footballers in Saudi Arabia
Association football forwards
Footballers from Cali